The  was the official executive administrative branch of the government of the Japanese-controlled Empire of Great Manchuria from 1934–1945.

Background
Manchukuo was proclaimed a monarchy on 1 March 1934, with former Qing dynasty emperor Puyi assuming the Manchukuo throne under the reign name of Emperor Kang-de. The Privy Council was an appointive body consisting of Puyi's closest friends and confidants, and the Legislative Council was largely an honorary body without authority. The State Council was therefore the center of political power in Manchukuo.

Workings
The General Affairs State Council consisted of ten ministries forming a cabinet. The cabinet ministers were all native Manchukuoans, of either ethnic Manchu or Han Chinese descent, and in all cases, the vice-ministers in each ministry were Imperial Japanese Army officers, appointed by the Kwantung Army leadership. The Japanese vice-ministers functions in roles similar to British resident officers in British overseas protectorates in that they had final approval over any actions of the "native" ministers. The State Council itself was presided over by a Secretary-General, the first of whom was Takuzo Komai, an ethnic Japanese.

The Council's initial composition was at the time of Prime Minister Zheng Xiaoxu included the following portfolios:

 Prime Minister 
 Home Affairs 
 Foreign Affairs 
 Defense 
 Finance
 Industry and Agriculture
 Transportation and Communications 
 Justice 
 Education 
 Mongolian Affairs

The State Council building
The State Council Building was an imposing five-story structure with two four-story wings built in downtown Hsinking in reinforced concrete with a portal frame construction with a pseudo-oriental roof with towers. The building was designed so that its main entrance faces west. The building is still in use today by the Jilin provincial government in the People's Republic of China. Each of the main cabinet-level ministries also had its own imposing building. Many of these structures are still in use in various capacities in modern China.

References

Politics of Manchukuo